San José la Colonia is located in Alta Verapaz, Guatemala, on the northern outskirts of the city of Cobán. Formerly a nationalized finca, San José la Colonia was designated a national park in 1976. The park covers an area of 54 ha, and is managed by the National Forestry Institute (INAB).

References

National parks of Guatemala
Protected areas established in 1976